Frick railway station is a railway station in the municipality of Frick, in the Swiss canton of Aargau. It is an intermediate stop on the Bözberg line and is served by local and regional trains.

Services

Regional 
The following regional trains call at Frick:

 InterRegio: half-hourly service from Basel SBB to Zürich Hauptbahnhof, with every other train continuing to Zürich Airport.

Local 
Frick is served by the S1 the Basel S-Bahn:

 : hourly service to Basel SBB.

References

External links 
 
 

Railway stations in the canton of Aargau
Swiss Federal Railways stations